Fugazi, also known as the EP 7 Songs, is the debut eponymous release by the American post-hardcore band Fugazi. Unlike all their other releases, Guy Picciotto did not contribute guitar to this record; all guitar was performed by Ian MacKaye. It was originally recorded in June 1988 and released in November 1988 on vinyl and again in 1989 on the compilation release 13 Songs along with the following EP Margin Walker. The photo used for the album cover was taken on June 30, 1988 at Maxwell's in Hoboken, New Jersey.

Content

The release features "Waiting Room" which is often seen as the band's most well-known song, notorious for "the attention-getting drop into silence that occurs at the 22-second mark," as well as for its "relentless ska/reggae-inflected drive", and "Suggestion", a "Meters-meets-Ruts thrust."

Reception 
The band's entry in the Trouser Press record guide, written by Ian McCaleb, Ira Robbins and Mike Fournier, calls the EP an "impressive debut" which "blends a classic DC-core sensibility with a mature, objective outlook and crisply produced mid-tempo songs that are dynamic, aggressive and accessible." They write that MacKaye and Picciotto "trade raw emotionalism for an introspective, almost poetic vision, using abstractions in strongly structured compositions like “Bulldog Front” and “Give Me the Cure,” a contemplation on death." Andy Kellman of AllMusic calls the EP "excellent".

Legacy

Accolades 
In 2018, Pitchfork ranked the EP at #45 on their list of "The 200 Best Albums of the 1980s", with Evan Rytlewski writing that while the band "would go on to release hours of the most inventive post-hardcore ever, [...] they never recorded anything else so instantly gratifying."

Influence 
According to Kim Thayil of Soundgarden, the band would regularly listen to cassettes of the Fugazi EP and Nirvana's Bleach whilst on tour. Walter Shcreifels of Quicksand, in a feature for Revolver, ranked it the best post-hardcore album of all time and called it "ground zero for whatever's great about the genre."

"Waiting Room" has been covered by a wide range of musicians since the EP's release. Tropical Fuck Storm covered "Burning" live. Prong covered "Give Me the Cure". Pearl Jam covered "Suggestion" in various concerts in the early 1990s, usually as a tag to another song or an improvised jam. The track was also covered by Jonah Matranga and Taina Asili (in collaboration with the Nuyorican hip-hop/punk band Ricanstruction).

Track listing

Personnel 
 Ian MacKaye – vocals, guitar
 Guy Picciotto – vocals
 Joe Lally – bass
 Brendan Canty – drums

References

Fugazi EPs
1988 debut EPs
Dischord Records EPs
Albums produced by Ted Niceley
Albums produced by Ian MacKaye